Squarepoint Capital ("Squarepoint") is a global proprietary trading and  investment management firm headquartered in New York City with additional offices in Europe and Asia. The firm is known for its quantitative finance approach to investing.

Background 

The origins of Squarepoint can be traced to nQuant, a proprietary trading unit founded within Lehman Brothers in 2000. Its founders were Olivier Durantel and Gregoire Schneider. Antoine Fillet and Maxime Fortin joined the team in 2003 and 2004 respectively. All four of them were alumni of École Polytechnique, a French engineering school. nQuant was sold to Barclays in 2008 after it acquired Lehman Brothers North American operations.

In May 2014, Barclays announced it planned to cut jobs and businesses that were not considered part of its core business. nQuant, was considered a non-core business and the Volcker Rule meant it could no longer perform proprietary trading activities under a commercial bank. In August 2014, it was reported that nQuant was going to be spun off as an independent firm with 60 employees leaving.

On December 15, 2014, nQuant was spun off as an independent firm and was renamed to Squarepoint. On January 2, 2015, Squarepoint received approval from the Financial Conduct Authority to manage investments on behalf of third parties. Within two years of its launch, Squarepoint doubled its staff headcount.

According the firm's filing in 2020, 80% of its investors are non-U.S.

In October 2021, Squarepoint entered a strategic partnership with Arini Capital, a European hedge fund. Squarepoint would provide support to the fund.

In March 2022, it was reported Squarepoint has been trading bitcoin futures on the Chicago Mercantile Exchange but has been hesitant on crypto trading.

Lawsuits

Footnoted.com 
Footnoted.com was a financial news and research website founded by Michelle Leder. Leder launched a lawsuit against Squarepoint alleging it had stolen 16,000 pages worth of information without paying.

Vojislav Sesum 
In April 2018, Squarepoint launched a lawsuit against a former employee, Vojislav Sesum, who it claimed had developed a trading strategy while at Squarepoint and subsequently offered it to Millennium Management. The arbitrator initially directed Sesum to pay Squarepoint $188,137 in damages plus $919,053 disgorged profits he received from Millennium although the final order issued in 2020 was partially reduced.

References

External links
 

2014 establishments in the United Kingdom
Financial derivative trading companies
Financial services companies established in 2014
Hedge fund firms in New York City
Investment management companies of the United States
Privately held companies based in New York City